, abbreviated as LO, is a Japanese lolicon-focused erotic manga magazine. The magazine has been published by Akane Shinsha since the October 2002 issue released on September 20, 2002, and was published irregularly until May 2004, when it became a monthly magazine. The "LO" stands for "lolita only", reflecting its focus on fictional young (or young-looking) girl characters.

History
When first published, Comic LO helped trigger a small boom in lolicon manga in the early 2000s.

Comic LO was originally an extra issue of other erotic magazines, but it became independent on December 21, 2005. On May 22, 2010, the publisher put out an announcement to stop the illegal uploading of the magazine on its official website. In December, 2015 a glimpse of the standards of Comic LO were brought forward regarding the artwork. Amagappa Shōjogun, a manga artist for the magazine was told to draw more girls that look like 9 year olds as 8 was too young.

The cover illustrations are by Takamichi. Volume 200 was published on September 19, 2020.

References

External links
 Comic LO (Current official website)
 Comic LO (Old official website)
 comicLO_YLNT (Pawoo official account)

2002 establishments in Japan
Magazines established in 2002
Men's magazines published in Japan
Monthly manga magazines published in Japan
Pornographic manga magazines
Lolicon